Robin Gartner (born November 7, 1988) is a Swedish professional ice hockey defenceman. He is currently an unrestricted free agent who most recently played with EC KAC of the Austrian Hockey League (EBEL).

Gartner made his Elitserien debut playing with HV71 during the 2005–06 Elitserien season. After two seasons with Örebro HK, Gartner left as a free agent to sign with his third SHL club, Leksands IF on April 16, 2014.

References

External links

1988 births
Living people
Bolzano HC players
HV71 players
Karlskrona HK players
EC KAC players
Leksands IF players
Mora IK players
IK Oskarshamn players
Örebro HK players
People from Nacka Municipality
Swedish ice hockey defencemen
Sportspeople from Stockholm County